Fengkai County is a county in western Guangdong Province, China, under the administration of the prefecture-level city of Zhaoqing.

History

About 140,000 years ago, there were human beings settled in nowadays fengkai. 

Feng Prefecture or Fengzhou was a prefecture of the Tang and Song empires.

Under the Qing, Fengchuan and Kaijian made up part of the commandery of Zhaoqing.

Administrative divisions

Climate

Notes

References

Citations

Bibliography
 , reprinted 2000.

Zhaoqing
County-level divisions of Guangdong